Venus Luxure No. 1 Baby is the second studio album by the indie rock band Girls Against Boys. It was released in 1993 on Touch and Go Records.

Production 
Venus Luxure No. 1 Baby was produced by Ted Niceley.

Release 
Venus Luxure No. 1 Baby was released on August 20, 1993, by record label Touch and Go.

Reception 

In his retrospective review, Ned Raggett of AllMusic wrote, "when Girls Against Boys released Venus Luxure, it was clear that the quartet had really turned into something spectacular. Avoiding the clichés of early-'90s indie rock for its own surly, charismatic edge, Girls Against Boys here kicked out the jams like nobody's business." Trouser Press wrote that "Venus Luxure No. 1 Baby is where all the flailing around starts to gel."

Legacy 

The album was included in the book 1001 Albums You Must Hear Before You Die.

The song "Bulletproof Cupid" is included in the soundtrack of video game Need for Speed: The Run.

Track listing

Personnel 
Adapted from the Venus Luxure No. 1 Baby liner notes.

 Girls Against Boys
 Alexis Fleisig – drums
 Eli Janney – sampler, bass guitar, vocals, engineering
 Scott McCloud – lead vocals, guitar
 Johnny Temple – bass guitar

Production and additional personnel
 Peter Hayes – cover art
 Drew Mazurek – engineering
 Ted Niceley – production
 Steve Palmieri – engineering

Release history

References

External links 
 

1993 albums
Girls Against Boys albums
Touch and Go Records albums
Albums produced by Ted Niceley